Sapunov, feminine Sapunova is a Russian and Ukrainian surname. Notable people with the surname include:

Danylo Sapunov (born 1982), Kazakhstani and Ukrainian triathlete
Nikolai Sapunov (1880–1912), Russian painter
 Tatyana Sapunova (born 1974) a Russian biophysicist
 Yulia Sapunova Yelistratova (born 1988) a professional Ukrainian triathlete

Russian-language surnames
Ukrainian-language surnames